Interpersonal compatibility or interpersonal matching is the long-term interaction between two or more individuals in terms of the ease and comfort of communication.

Existing concepts
Although various concepts of interpersonal compatibility have existed from ancient times (see, e.g., Plato's Lysis), no general theory of interpersonal compatibility has been proposed in psychology. Existing concepts are contradictory in many details, beginning with the central point—whether compatibility is caused by matching psychological parameters or by their complementarity. At the same time, the idea of interpersonal compatibility is analyzed in non-scientific fields (see, e.g., Astrological compatibility).

Among existing psychological tools for studying and/or measuring interpersonal compatibility, the following are noteworthy:
 A test of interpersonal compatibility proposed by Timothy Leary
 A three-factor hypothesis (inclusion, control, and affection/openness) by William Schutz (further developed into FIRO-B questionnaire)
 Hans Jurgen Eysenck's hypothesis on compatibility between temperaments
 Social psychological research on similarity of interests and attitudes
 Compatibility test pamphlets of the 1930s and early computer dating of the 1950s, developed  by George W. Crane
 Hypothesis of compatibility between personality attitudes by Russell Ackoff and Frederick Edmund Emery,
 DMO tool by Lyudmila Sobchik (DMO stands for Interpersonal relations diagnostics,)

Socionics has proposed a theory of intertype relationships between psychological types based on a modified version of C.G. Jung's theory of psychological types. Communication between types is described using the concept of information metabolism proposed by Antoni Kępiński. Socionic data are much more representative than, e.g., those of Ackoff and Emery. Socionics allocates 16 types of the relations — from most attractive and comfortable up to disputed. The understanding of a nature of these relations helps to solve a number of problems of the interpersonal relations, including aspects of psychological and sexual compatibility. The researches of married couples by Aleksandr Bukalov et al.,  have shown that the family relations submit to the laws, which are opened by socionics. The study of socionic type allocation in casually selected married couples confirmed the main rules of the theory of intertype relations in socionics. So, the dual relations (full addition) make 45% and the intraquadral relations make 64% of investigated couples.

Alternative hypotheses of intertype relationships were later proposed by adherents of MBTI (D. Keirsey's hypothesis of compatibility between Keirsey temperaments). Neither of these hypotheses are commonly accepted in the Myers–Briggs type indicator theory. MBTI in Russia is often confused with socionics, although the 16 types in these theories are described differently and do not correlate exactly. Both theories, MBTI and socionics, have been criticized as pseudoscience.

Controversy
The following problems may be reasons for the absence of a theory of psychological compatibility:
 Lack of generally accepted criteria for measuring compatibility ("degrees of compatibility")
 The terms compatibility and matching, although not identical, are often confused in common speech (the first rather comprises complementarity and the second similarity of partners)
 The problem's unclear status in social science (the problem may belong to social psychology, sociology, personality psychology etc.)
 Different psychological theories propose different parameters of personality, but only few of them are generally accepted among psychologists (e.g. cognitive styles); still, even generally accepted criteria may be irrelevant to interpersonal compatibility
 Some, if not all personality parameters (even genetically determined ones), may change over time and/or due to interpersonal interaction
 The non-traditional view of psychological dependency, which is not considered drug dependency, but rather a need (unilateral or mutual) for somebody else's psychological support that one cannot or can hardly provide by him/herself.

MHC and sexual mating

It has been suggested that MHC plays a role in the selection of potential mates, via olfaction. MHC genes make molecules that enable the immune system to recognize invaders; generally, the more diverse the MHC genes of the parents, the stronger the immune system of the offspring. It would therefore be beneficial to have evolved systems of recognizing individuals with different MHC genes and preferentially selecting them to breed with.

Yamazaki et al. (1976) showed this to be the case for male mice, which show a preference for females of different MHC. Similar results have been obtained with fish.

In 1995, Swiss biologist Claus Wedekind determined MHC influences both body odors and body odor preferences in humans, and that the women's preferences depend on their hormonal status. In an experiment, a group of female college students smelled T-shirts that had been worn by male students for two nights, without deodorant, cologne or scented soaps. Overwhelmingly, the women preferred the odors of men with dissimilar MHCs to their own. However, their preference was reversed if they were taking oral contraceptives. The hypothesis is that MHCs affect mate choice and that oral contraceptives can interfere with the preference for variation. A study in 2005 on 58 test subjects confirmed that taking oral contraceptives made women prefer men with MHCs similar to their own. Several follow up studies have confirmed the belief that paternally inherited HLA-associated odors influence odor preference and may serve as social cues. In 2008, Peter Donnelly and colleagues proposed that MHC is related to mating choice in some human populations.

Complementarity
Complementarity in social psychology is defined on the basis of the interpersonal circle (Carson, 1969), according to which interpersonal behaviors fall on a circle with two dimensions, namely dominance (i.e. dominant–submissive) and warmth (i.e. hostile–friendly). It states that each interpersonal behavior invites certain responses of another interactant. The behavior and the response it invites are said to be complementary (Horowitz, Dryer, & Krasnoperova, 1997) when friendly behavior begets hostile behavior, and dominant behavior begets submissive behavior. When people fail to give the invited response, it is said to be a non-complementary interaction. If the first person's behavior invites a reaction from the second person that matches the second person's goals, then the second person is satisfied; otherwise, the second person is frustrated (Dryer & Horowitz, 1997).

Factors affecting complementarity
 Setting i.e. in work, at home, in recreation and others

 Social Role Status e.g. supervisors, coworker and supervisee

Time e.g. strangers, old friends

See also

 Arranged marriage
 Emotional conflict
 Conflictology
 Dating
 Endogamy
 Family therapy
 Friendship
 Interpersonal attraction
 Interpersonal communication
 Interpersonal relations
 Irreconcilable differences
 Love
 Selection of a partner
 Social interaction
 Sociometry
 Socionics
 Substance dependence

Notes

References
 Action G. Scott (2001), The Interpersonal Principle of Complementarity: A Meta-Analysis, Retrieved Apr 2, 2008, from http://www.personalityresearch.org/acton/meta-analysis.html
 Ansell, E.B.; Kurtz, J.E.; Markey, P.M. (2008) Gender Differences in Interpersonal Complementarity Within Roommate Dyads, Personality And Social Psychology Bulletin, Vol. 34, No. 4 pp. 502–512, April 2008
 Carson, R. (1969). Interaction concepts of personality. Chicago: Aldine.
 Dryer, D.C.; Horowitz, Leonard M. (1997) When Do Opposite Attract? Interpersonal Complementarity Versus Similarity, Journal of Personality and Social Psychology Vol 72 No. 3, 592–603, 1997
 Horowitz, L.M., Dryer, D.C., & Krasnoperova, E.N. (1997). The circumplex structure of interpersonal problems. In R. Plutchik & H.R. Conte (Eds.), Circumplex models of personality and emotions. Washington, DC: American Psychological Association.
 Locke, Kenneth D.; Sadler, Pamela (2007) Self-Efficacy, Values, and Complementarity in Dyadic Interactions: Integrating Interpersonal and Social-Cognitive Theory, Personality And Social Psychology Bulletin, Vol. 33, no. 1, pp. 94–109, January 2007
 Moskowitz, D.s.; Ho, Moon-ho Ringo; Turcotte-tremblay, Anne-marie (2007) Contextual Influences on Interpersonal Complementarity, Personality And Social Psychology Bulletin, Vol. 33, no. 8, pp. 1051–1063, August 2007
 Tracey, Terence J.G. (2004) Levels of Interpersonal Complementarity: A Simplex Representation, Personality And Social Psychology Bulletin, Vol. 30, no. 9, pp. 1211–1225, September 2004

Literature

 Васильев Вл. Н., Рамазанова А. П., Богомаз С. А. Познай других — найди себя (Лекции о психологических типах и их отношениях). — Томск: 1996. — 185 с.
 Гуленко В. В. Структурно-функциональная соционика: Разработка метода комбинаторики полярностей. — Ч.1 — Киев: «Транспорт України», 1999. — 187 с.
 Обозов Н. Н. Психология межличностных отношений. — К.: Высшая школа, 1990.
 Собчик Л. Н. Диагностика психологической совместимости. — СПб.: «Речь», 2002. — 80 с.
 Филатова Е. С. Соционика личных отношений. — М., «Чёрная белка», 2004. — 76 с.

Interpersonal relationships
Philosophy of love